Đỗ Thị Thu Trang (born 4 November 1983) is a Vietnamese former footballer who played as a goalkeeper. She has been a member of the Vietnam women's national team.

References

1983 births
Living people
Women's association football goalkeepers
Vietnamese women's footballers
Vietnam women's international footballers
Footballers at the 2010 Asian Games
Asian Games competitors for Vietnam
21st-century Vietnamese women